The Miracle Maker is a 1999 British-Russian-American stop motion-animated film directed by Derek Hayes and Stanislav Sokolov of the life of Jesus Christ, voiced by Ralph Fiennes. Hand-drawn animated cartoons are used to distinguish flashbacks, parables, stories, spiritual encounters and visions from the main plot, which is all in stop motion.

A Welsh language version premiered on S4C in 1999 with an English version distributed theatrically by Icon Film Distribution in the UK in 2000. The film was also released theatrically in France, Italy, Australia, Spain, Brazil, Japan, Sweden and Poland. It was also distributed in the USA following the ABC USA premiere in 2000, while Artisan Entertainment, and later Lionsgate, held the home video rights.

Plot 
Based on: Life of Jesus in the New Testament

100 years into the Roman Occupation of Judea, Capernaum priest Jairus and his sick daughter Tamar travel to Sepphoris to see a doctor their friend Cleopas says can help Tamar. While the doctor confides to Jairus her condition is incurable, Tamar witnesses a deranged woman, Mary Magdalene, defended by Jesus, a carpenter building a new synagogue. Jesus visits his mother, Mary, who recalls his birth, the visit of the Wise Men and his conferring with the elders at the Temple.

Jesus is baptised by John the Baptist in the Jordan River, where he is spoken to by a heavenly voice, then wanders into the wilderness and resists temptation by Satan. Jesus begins preaching in Capernaum, where Tamar and her mother Rachel hear him give the Sermon on the Mount and tell the Parable of the Wise and the Foolish Builders. Judas, a zealot plotting an uprising against the Roman Empire, believes Jesus is the Messiah come to lead the people to victory and leaves the zealots to follow him.

The Temple priests question the legitimacy of Jesus's teachings, with priest Ben Azra particularly concerned he could lead a revolt. Jesus commandeers the boat of Simon to preach to crowds from the water, then instructs the fishermen into performing the miraculous catch of fish, after which Simon recognizes Jesus as the Messiah. Jesus continues to preach, perform miracles, chooses his twelve apostles (Changing Simon's name to Peter) and frees Mary Magdalene of the demons who possess her. When Jesus forgives her sins in front of synagogue leaders, Ben Azra and Simon the Pharisee condemn him as being in league with the Devil.

Tamar's illness worsens and though fearful of angering the priests, Jairus goes to ask Jesus to save her. Tamar dies before Jesus is able to help her, but Jesus encourages Jairus to remain faithful and raises Tamar, who awakens fully healed. Jesus mourns for John the Baptist after he is killed by King Herod, who agrees with Ben Azra that Jesus must be dealt with to prevent Pontius Pilate from reporting an uprising against Rome. Jairus, Rachel, Cleopas, and Tamar join Jesus and his followers as they journey to Jerusalem for Passover. High priest Caiaphas is told by Ben Azra he witnessed Jesus raising his friend Lazarus from the dead and his journey to Jerusalem is the start of an uprising, but Caiaphas reasons that Jesus can be disposed of.

Jesus enters Jerusalem, greeted by adoring crowds, where he turns the tables of the temple traders, validates the payment of taxes to Caesar and predicts his own death. Judas, now believing Jesus to be a false Messiah, resolves to betray him to save himself and the Jewish people and goes to Ben Azra and the temple priests, who are seeking to arrest Jesus away from the crowds. Jesus has the Passover meal with his followers, where he tells the disciples they will abandon him. He goes to the Garden of Gethsemane, where he refuses a final temptation by Satan to escape his fate, praying for God's will to be done. Judas leads the authorities to Jesus, who is arrested while the disciples flee.

Jesus is tried by Caiaphas and the Sanhedrin, is mocked by Herod and sent to Pilate, who finds no case against Jesus but Ben Azra has crowds call for Jesus's execution and Caiaphas blackmails Pilate into condemning Jesus to death. Jesus is crucified in sight of his followers, proclaiming ‘It is finished’ and the curtain that separates the Holy of Holies is torn as he dies. Jesus's body is laid in a tomb which Mary Magdalene and Peter both find empty on Sunday morning, but both encounter Jesus in the garden. Cleopas and Jairus tell the disciples they encountered Jesus on the road to Emmaus, Thomas remains doubtful until Jesus appears before him. Jesus gathers all his followers where he tells them to give his teachings to the world before ascending into heaven. Tamar tells everyone that the Kingdom of God has come.

Cast 

 Ioan Gruffudd (Welsh version), Ralph Fiennes (English version) as Jesus
 Michael Bryant as God, Doctor
 Rebecca Callard as Tamar
 Julie Christie as Rachel
 William Hurt as Jairus
 Daniel Massey as Cleopas
 Richard E. Grant as John the Baptist
 Ian Holm as Pontius Pilate
 Anton Lesser as King Herod
 David Schofield as Caiaphas
 Alfred Molina as Simon the Pharisee
 Bob Peck as Joseph of Arimathea
 William Hootkins as Satan
 Ken Stott as Simon Peter
 Lisa Palfrey (Welsh version), Miranda Richardson (English version) as Mary Magdalene
 David Thewlis as Judas Iscariot
 Emily Mortimer as Mary of Nazareth
 Ewan Stewart as Andrew
 Dougray Scott as John
 James Frain as Thomas
 Robert Duncan as Lazarus
 Julie Higginson as Mary
 Sian Rivers as Martha
 Tim McInnerny as Barabbas
 Antony Sher as Ben Azra
 Lennie James as Tribune Quintilus

See also 
 List of animated feature films
 List of stop-motion films

References

External links 
 The Miracle Maker  at the Arts & Faith Top100 Spiritually Significant Films list
 

Portrayals of Jesus in film
1999 animated films
1999 films
Christian animation
Russian animated films
British animated films
1990s stop-motion animated films
Portrayals of the Virgin Mary in film
Cultural depictions of John the Baptist
Cultural depictions of Judas Iscariot
Cultural depictions of Pontius Pilate
Icon Productions films
Films set in ancient Rome
Welsh films
Films scored by Anne Dudley
Portrayals of Mary Magdalene in film
Cultural depictions of Saint Peter
Films about Jesus
1990s British films